In algebraic geometry, an action of a group scheme is a generalization of a group action to a group scheme. Precisely, given a group S-scheme G, a left action of G on an S-scheme X is an S-morphism

such that
 (associativity) , where  is the group law,
 (unitality) , where  is the identity section of G.

A right action of G on X is defined analogously. A scheme equipped with a left or right action of a group scheme G is called a G-scheme. An equivariant morphism between G-schemes is a morphism of schemes that intertwines the respective G-actions.

More generally, one can also consider (at least some special case of) an action of a group functor: viewing G as a functor, an action is given as a natural transformation satisfying the conditions analogous to the above. Alternatively, some authors study group action in the language of a groupoid; a group-scheme action is then an example of a groupoid scheme.

Constructs 
The usual constructs for a group action such as orbits generalize to a group-scheme action. Let  be a given group-scheme action as above.

The orbit of x is the image of the orbit map .

Problem of constructing a quotient 

Unlike a set-theoretic group action, there is no straightforward way to construct a quotient for a group-scheme action. One exception is the case when the action is free, the case of a principal fiber bundle.

There are several approaches to overcome this difficulty:
Level structure - Perhaps the oldest, the approach replaces an object to classify by an object together with a level structure
Geometric invariant theory - throw away bad orbits and then take a quotient. The drawback is that there is no canonical way to introduce the notion of "bad orbits"; the notion depends on a choice of linearization. See also: categorical quotient, GIT quotient.
Borel construction - this is an approach essentially from algebraic topology; this approach requires one to work with an infinite-dimensional space.
Analytic approach, the theory of Teichmüller space
Quotient stack - in a sense, this is the ultimate answer to the problem. Roughly, a "quotient prestack" is the category of orbits and one stackify (i.e., the introduction of the notion of a torsor) it to get a quotient stack.

Depending on applications, another approach would be to shift the focus away from a space then onto stuff on a space; e.g., topos. So the problem shifts from the classification of orbits to that of equivariant objects.

See also 
groupoid scheme
Sumihiro's theorem
equivariant sheaf
Borel fixed-point theorem

References 

Algebraic geometry